Scenic is an unincorporated community and census-designated place (CDP) in Mohave County in extreme northwestern Arizona, United States. As of the 2020 census, its population was 1,321, down from 1,643 in 2010.

Scenic is located on the eastern side of the Nevada-Arizona state line from Mesquite, Nevada. The primary road access is from South Scenic Boulevard, which runs south from Highway 91 (the frontage road along the south side of Interstate 15).

Scenic is located within the Littlefield ZIP code of 86432. Residents from Scenic must either use the post office in Mesquite (ZIP code 89024) or in Beaver Dam. The Beaver Dam Post Office provides post office boxes for several small communities along the Virgin River and Interstate 15. These communities (all unincorporated) are Littlefield, Beaver Dam, Scenic, Arvada, and Desert Springs.

Scenic is within the Littlefield Unified School District, which is geographically the largest school district in Arizona.

Like all of the Arizona Strip area, Scenic is isolated from the rest of the state of Arizona due to its location north of the Grand Canyon and Colorado River.  In order to drive to the rest of the state, one must drive either through Nevada or Utah or fly from the airports in Mesquite, Nevada or St. George, Utah.

The area is popular among many snowbirds who leave colder parts of the world to spend some time here to enjoy the environment, climate, and recreational opportunities. The area of Mesquite has a number of golf courses, parks and casinos, and is not far from Las Vegas. Other attractions include the Paiute Wilderness, Grand Canyon–Parashant National Monument and the Virgin River narrows and canyon.

Most properties are residential, but there are several businesses in the community, including the "Scenic General Store" at 2960 Scenic Blvd. The Mini-Storage and La Santisima Trinidad Catholic Church are part of the community. The Palms Golf Club, Mesquite Motocross Park, Oasis Gun Club, Staker Parson Companies, and Desert Skies Resort are in part of the Arvada, Arizona area. Most businesses use a post office box address in either Mesquite or Beaver Dam.

Demographics

See also
 Beaver Dam High School (Beaver Dam, Arizona)
 The Church of Jesus Christ of Latter-day Saints in Arizona

References

External links
 Mohave County, Arizona
 Littlefield Unified School District No. 9

Census-designated places in Mohave County, Arizona